Ali Antsukhskiy (1 June 1947 – 26 February 1996) was an Avar native of Balakan, member of National Assembly of Azerbaijan who claimed to be the leader of the Avar people. He was assassinated in the center of Baku in 1996.

Milli Məclis
Antsukhskiy was elected to the National Assembly of Azerbaijan in 1995.

Assassination
Antsukhskiy was assassinated in the center of Baku in 1996. The criminals were convicted and sentenced.

References

Avar people
Azerbaijani people of Avar descent
Members of the National Assembly (Azerbaijan)
People murdered in Azerbaijan
1996 deaths
Assassinated Azerbaijani politicians
1947 births